Hegyi ("of (the) hill") is a Hungarian surname:
 Julius Hegyi (1923–2007), American conductor and violinist
 Gyula Hegyi (born 1951), Hungarian politician
  (born 1954), Hungarian-Austrian art historian
  (born 1986), Hungarian ice hockey player
 Zomilla Hegyi (born 1989), Hungarian-Spanish sprint canoer

See also 
 Hegyi is the Hungarian name of Zemplínske Kopčany

Hungarian-language surnames